Vaba Maa ('Free Country') was a daily newspaper in Estonia, published from Tallinn. It was the organ of the Estonian Labour Party. Vaba Maa had a circulation of about 50,000 in the early 1920s.

Ants Piip became the editor of Vaba Maa in 1923.

Vaba Maa was owned by Aleksander Weiler.

References

Newspapers published in Estonia
Estonian-language newspapers
1920s in Estonia
Mass media in Tallinn